Leontopodium coreanum, also known as Korean edelweiss, is a species of plant in the family Asteraceae. It is native to Korea and comprises two varieties: Leontopodium coreanum var. coreanum and Leontopodium coreanum var. hallaisanense.

References

coreanum
Plants described in 1917